L.F.M. (Lawrence Franklin Mather) Memorial Academy was a private Christian academy located in Miramichi, New Brunswick. It began in September 1999, under the name Ridgeway North Private Christian School.

 

Educational institutions established in 1999
Private schools in New Brunswick
1999 establishments in New Brunswick
Schools in Miramichi, New Brunswick